Rampton may refer to:

People

Cal Rampton (1913–2007), U.S. politician
George Rampton (1888–1971), English footballer
Richard Rampton (born 1941), British lawyer
Sheldon Rampton (born 1957), U.S. political writer
Lucybeth Rampton  (1914–2004)
Tony Rampton (born 1976), former New Zealand professional basketball player. 
Tony Rampton (businessman) (1915–1993), chairman of Freemans and philanthropist
Crosby Rampton (born 1972)

Places

Rampton, Cambridgeshire
Rampton, Nottinghamshire
Rampton Secure Hospital
Rampton and Woodbeck, a parish formerly called just "Rampton"

Music

Rampton (album), 2002 album by English drone doom supergroup Teeth of Lions Rule the Divine